The 1951 Loyola Lions football team was an American football team that represented Loyola University of Los Angeles (now known as Loyola Marymount University) as an independent during the 1951 college football season. In their third season under head coach Jordan Olivar, the Lions compiled a 3–6 record and were outscored by a total of 229 to 180.

Discontinuation of the program
On December 30, 1951, one month after the season ended, Loyola's president, the Rev. Charles S. Casassa, SJ, announced that the school was discontinuing its intercollegiate football program. The announcement shocked coaches, students, and alumni at the school.

Loyola's president attributed the decision to the loss of several hundred students resulting from the Korean War which began in June 1950. The Los Angeles Times wrote that other likely factors influencing Loyola's decision included concerns about overemphasis on football, rising costs, heightened competition for players, the platoon system with its demand for a greater number of players, the lack of a suitable home field, and difficulty in scheduling games with popular teams such as UCLA and USC.

Other independent Catholic schools on the West Coast also discontinued their programs during this time period. Saint Mary's College of California disbanded its program after the 1950 season, and the University of San Francisco made its announcement on the same day as Loyola.

Schedule

References

Loyola
Loyola Lions football seasons
Loyola Lions football